World Dryer Corporation is a Berkeley, Illinois based manufacturer of hand dryers and related products. Established in 1950 with the Model A, it was a subsidiary of Beatrice Foods, has been a subsidiary of Carrier Corporation, and in 2017 joined the Zurn Industries brand of Rexnord Corp.

Products
 Hand dryers
 Changing tables
 Hair dryers

History
World Dryer was founded in 1950 by inventor George Clemens, with the intention of inventing and selling a new hand dryer that could compete against paper towels. It was better for the environment, more sanitary (this claim has been disputed by recent studies), and required less frequent maintenance. Three years later, Clemens patented a new hand dryer design, called the Model A. The original version of the Model A featured a wall-mounted assembly, a cast-iron cover, push-button operation, and a swivel nozzle.

The Model A quickly became the industry-standard electric hand dryer, and established World Dryer as the premier manufacturer of electric hand dryers. Beginning in 1955, World Dryer began manufacturing and exporting units internationally via a partnership with UK-based Warner Howard Limited.
 
In 1968, World Dryer introduced a version of the Model A with a recessed assembly rather than a wall-mounted version. This version, called the Model RA, was modified slightly in 1990 to ensure compliance with the Americans With Disabilities Act of 1990, and was further modified in 2005 with a squashed nozzle (Q Nozzle). Other available options on the Model A include a steel cover rather than a cast iron one (DA) and a fixed non-swivel nozzle (A5).

In 1974, World Dryer was acquired by Beatrice Foods Co., and underwent a rebranding later that year, which saw the introduction of the current dark red "globe" logo. Also in 1974, World Dryer introduced a new hair dryer, called the Model B, which features the same motor and assembly as the Model A, but the unit is flipped upside down and is changed from a 30-second timer to a 80-second timer.

In 1985, Beatrice Foods Co. spun off World Dryer as an independent company. Model As manufactured during Beatrice Foods Co.'s ownership of World Dryer from the mid-1970s to mid-1980s include the byline "A Division of Beatrice Foods Co" on their front labels. World Dryer sold their hand dryer model units to Bradley Corp with a modified version of the their cast iron cover.  

In 1986, World Dryer introduced two new low-cost models, the NoTouch and the Airspeed. The NoTouch was the first automatic hand dryer.

In 1987, World Dryer introduced an automatic version of the Model A, known as the XA, 

In 1992, World Dryer merged with the Electric-Aire Company.

In 2000, World Dryer acquired Quebec-based Nova Hand Dryers. 

Beginning in 2005, World Dryer introduced several new models to compete against faster and more modern models that entered the market in the late 1990s and early 2000s, most notably the Dyson Airblade and the Xlerator from Excel Dryer, the latter of which had, by this time, overtaken the World Dryer Model A as the industry standard. The first of these was the AirMax in 2005, which is externally identical to the Model A Series, but is fitted with a larger, more powerful motor, drying a user’s hands in 15 seconds. This was followed by the Airforce in 2008, the speed-adjustable SMARTdri in 2010, the ADA-compliant SLIMdri in 2011, the hands-in VMax in 2013, and the low-electricity VERDEdri in 2015.

Galleries

References

External links

Manufacturing companies established in 1950
Manufacturing companies based in Illinois
Companies based in Cook County, Illinois
1950 establishments in Illinois
Personal care companies
Sanitation companies